This Prize for Scenario is awarded to comics authors at the Angoulême International Comics Festival.

In the following list, the winner of the award is listed first, followed by the nominees.

1990s
 1993: Saigon-Hanoï by Cosey, Dupuis
 1994: Julius Corentin Acquefacques, prisonnier des rêves: Le processus by Marc-Antoine Mathieu, Delcourt
 1995: Le lièvre de Mars: Tome 2 by Antonio Parras and Patrick Cothias, Glénat
 1996: Juan Solo: Fils de flingue by Georges Bess and Alejandro Jodorowsky,  Les Humanoïdes Associés
 1997: Le voyage by Edmond Baudoin, L'Association
 1998: Kid Congo by Jacques de Loustal and Philippe Paringaux, Casterman
 1999: La grande arnaque by Carlos Trillo and Domingo Mandrafina, Albin Michel

2000s
 2000: L'ascension du Haut Mal: Tome 4 by David B.
 Berceuse assassine: Les jambes de Martha by Ralf Meyer and Philippe Tome
 Péché mortel: Autopsie d'un mensonge by Joseph Griesmar and Toff
 Tramp: Pour Hélène by Patrick Jusseaume and Jean-Charles Kraehn
 Trois Allumettes by David Chauvel and Hervé Boivin
 2001: Les quatre fleuves by Edmond Baudoin and Fred Vargas
 Les innommables: Pas-de-mâchoire by Didier Conrad and Yann
 Les petits contes noirs: La fin du monde by Pierre and Frank Le Gall
 Professeur Bell: Les poupées de Jérusalem by Joann Sfar
 La rose de Jéricho: Dernier jour by Uriel
 2002: Persepolis: Tome 2 by Marjane Satrapi, L'Association
 Special mention for Rural! by Étienne Davodeau, Delcourt
 Amours fragiles: Le Dernier Printemps by Philippe Richelle and Jean-Michel Beuriot, Casterman
 Le décalogue: Le serment by TBC and Frank Giroud, Glénat
 Green Manor: Assassins et gentlemen by Fabien Vehlmann and Denis Bodart, Dupuis
 La ligue des gentlemen extraordinaires (The League of Extraordinary Gentlemen) by Alan Moore and Kevin O'Neill, USA Éditions
 Le Playboy (The Playboy) by Chester Brown, Les 400 Coups
 2003: Quartier lointain: Tome 1 by Jirô Taniguchi, Casterman
 Garduno, en temps de paix by Philippe Squarzoni, Les Requins Marteaux
 Max Fridman: Rio de Sangre by Vittorio Giardino, Glénat
 Monster by Naoki Urasawa, Kana
 Le pouvoir des innocents: Sergent Logan by Luc Brunschwig and Laurent Hirn, Delcourt
 Torso by Marc Andreyko and Brian Michael Bendis, Semic
 2004: The Sandman: La saison des brumes by Neil Gaiman, Delcourt
 Caravane by Bernard Olivié and Jorge Zentner, Amok
 Cuervos by Richard Marazano and Michel Durand, Glénat
 La grippe coloniale: Le retour d'Ulysse by Serge Huo Chao Si and Appollo, Vents d'Ouest
 La Ligue des Gentlemen extraordinaires: Tome 4 (The League of Extraordinary Gentlemen) by Alan Moore and Kevin O'Neill, USA Éditions
 Mémoire d'un commercial by Morvandiau, Les Requins Marteaux
 Planetes by Makoto Yukimura, Marvel
 2005: Comme des lapins by Ralf König, Glénat
 Clichés Beyrouth 1990 by Christophe Gaultier, Bruno Ricard and Sylvain Ricard, Les Humanoïdes Associés
 Le marquis d'Anaon: La providence by Fabien Vehlmann and Matthieu Bonhomme, Dargaud
 Le sang des Valentines by Christian De Metter and Muller Cattel, Casterman
 Summer of Love by Debbie Drechsler, L'Association
 Le tour de valse by Ruben Pellejero and Denis Lapière, Dupuis
 Y, le dernier homme: Tome 2 (Y the Last Man) by Brian K. Vaughan and Pia Guerra, Semic
 2006: Les mauvaises gens by Etienne Davodeau, Delcourt
 The autobiography of me too two by Guillaume Bouzard, Les Requins Marteaux
 Dans la prison by Kazuichi Hanawa, Ego comme x
 Hemingway by Jason, Carabas
 A History of Violence by John Wagner and Vince Locke, Delcourt
 Les passe-murailles: Le dedans des choses by Stéphane Oiry and Jean-Luc Cornette, Les Humanoïdes Associés
 Le roi des mouches: Hallorave by Mezzo and Pirus, Albin Michel

Angoulême International Comics Festival